Jean-Marie Banos (born 10 February 1962) is a Canadian former fencer. He competed in the individual and team sabre events at four consecutive Olympic Games between 1984 and 1996. His brother, Jean-Paul Banos, also fenced for Canada at four Olympic Games. He is married to Caitlin Bilodeaux, who fenced for the United States at the 1988 and 1992 Summer Olympics.

References

External links
 

1962 births
Living people
Canadian male fencers
Olympic fencers of Canada
Fencers at the 1984 Summer Olympics
Fencers at the 1988 Summer Olympics
Fencers at the 1992 Summer Olympics
Fencers at the 1996 Summer Olympics
Sportspeople from Ariège (department)
Pan American Games medalists in fencing
Pan American Games bronze medalists for Canada
Fencers at the 1987 Pan American Games
Medalists at the 1987 Pan American Games